Johann Peter Kaufmann (16 February 1764, Reuthe - 2 August 1829, Weimar) was an Austrian-born German sculptor.

Life and works 
His father, Kaspar, was involved in forestry work. His first lessons in wood carving came from him. As a young man, he followed other forestry workers to Alsace, where they found jobs as builders.

After a few years in Paris, he was able to obtain financial support from the Elector of Bavaria, Charles Theodore, that enabled him to study in Rome, where he worked with Bertel Thorvaldsen and Antonio Canova. He also became acquainted with the painter, Angelica Kaufmann, a distant cousin. They supported each other, and she left him a consideration in her will. He would stay in Rome for over twenty years and, at an unknown date, married Barbara Garzes, of Spanish origin. They had two sons: the elder, Ludwig (1800-1855), also became a sculptor. 

In 1817, upon the recommendation of Ferdinand Jagemann (whom he had met in Rome), he was appointed a Court Sculptor for Sachsen-Weimar-Eisenach by Grand Duke Karl August, succeeding  . Barbara refused to move with him, remaining in Rome and receiving a pension. She survived him by ten years. 

In addition, he took some students; notably Angelica Facius. 

He died of the "flux" (diarrhea?), which was attributed to overwork.

Sources 
 
 
 Călin Alexandru Mihai: Johann Peter Kauffmann und die spätklassizistische Skulptur am Weimarer Hof : ein Beitrag zur regionalen Kunstgeschichte Thüringens, Cluj-Napoca 2004 
 Simone Steger: Die Bildnisbüsten der Walhalla bei Donaustauf : von der Konzeption durch Ludwig I. von Bayern zur Ausführung (1807–1842), Diss. Munich 2011. (Online)

External links 

 

1764 births
1829 deaths
German sculptors
Austrian sculptors
Court sculptors
Austrian emigrants to Germany
People from Vorarlberg